William H. Wilcox (November 12, 1840 – October 27, 1913) was an American soldier who was awarded the Medal of Honor for his actions in the American Civil War.

Biography 
William H. Wilcox was born November 12, 1840, in Lempster, New Hampshire. He joined the 9th New Hampshire Infantry from his home town and served as a sergeant. He earned his medal at the Battle of Spotsylvania Court House, Virginia, on May 12, 1864. After the Civil War, Wilcox died on October 27, 1913, and is buried in Lake View Cemetery, South Haven, Michigan.

Medal of Honor citation 
For extraordinary heroism on 12 May 1864, in action at Spotsylvania, Virginia. Sergeant Wilcox took command of his company, deployed as skirmishers, after the officers in command of the skirmish line had both been wounded, conducting himself gallantly; afterwards, becoming separated from command, he asked and obtained permission to fight in another company.

References 

1840 births
1913 deaths
Union Army non-commissioned officers
United States Army Medal of Honor recipients
American Civil War recipients of the Medal of Honor